The Basketball competition at the 2010 Central American and Caribbean Games was held in Mayagüez, Puerto Rico.
 
The men's tournament was scheduled to be held from 24–30 July, the women's tournament was scheduled to be held from 18–23 July at the Palacio de Recreación y Deportes, the Raymond Dalmau Coliseum and the Arquelio Torres Coliseum all in Porta del Sol.

Men's tournament

Pool A

Pool B

Medal round

5th–7th places

Women's tournament

Pool A

Pool B

Medal round

5th–8th places

External links

basketball 
July 2010 sports events in North America
2010–11 in North American basketball
Basketball at the Central American and Caribbean Games
International basketball competitions hosted by Puerto Rico